Nassim Hamlaoui (born 25 February 1981 in Tizi Ouzou) is an Algerian football midfielder. He last played for USM Annaba in the Algerian league.

Hamlaoui made one appearance for the Algeria national football team in 2004.

Honours
 Won the CAF Cup three times with JS Kabylie in 2000, 2001 and 2002
 Won the Algerian League two times with JS Kabylie in 2004 and 2006

References

External links
 

1981 births
Living people
Footballers from Tizi Ouzou
Kabyle people
Algerian footballers
Algeria international footballers
Association football midfielders
JS Kabylie players
Algerian Ligue Professionnelle 1 players
USM Annaba players
JSM Béjaïa players
Algeria under-23 international footballers
Algeria youth international footballers
21st-century Algerian people